Meehaz Mountain is a mountain in the Cassiar Country of the Northern Interior of British Columbia, Canada, located on the north side of the headwaters of Teslin River and to the south of the Atsutla Range. It is a product of subglacial volcanism during the Pleistocene period when this area was covered by thick glacial ice, forming a subglacial volcano that never broke through the overlying glacial ice known as a subglacial mound.

See also
 List of Northern Cordilleran volcanoes
 List of volcanoes in Canada
 Volcanism of Canada
 Volcanism of Western Canada

References
 
 Meehaz Mountain in the Canadian Mountain Encyclopedia
 Catelogue of Canadian volcanoes: Meehaz Mountain

Cassiar Country
One-thousanders of British Columbia
Volcanoes of British Columbia
Subglacial mounds of Canada
Stikine Plateau
Pleistocene volcanoes
Monogenetic volcanoes
Northern Cordilleran Volcanic Province